is the Japanese name for the star Vega, also known as  in Japanese.

It may also refer to:
the weaver girl from the Chinese folk tale The Weaver Girl and the Cowherd
the weaver girl celebrated in Tanabata, a Japanese festival
Orihime, a Commuter Rapid Express train operated on the Keihan Main Line
Orihime, a satellite portion of ETS-VII, also known as KIKU-7
Orihime Inoue, a character from Bleach
Orihime Soletta, a character from Sakura Wars
Orihime Mitsuishi, a character from Aikatsu!

See also
Hikoboshi (disambiguation), the Japanese name for the star Altair